Maylene and the Sons of Disaster is an American heavy metal band from Birmingham, Alabama. The group were founded in 2004, shortly after vocalist Dallas Taylor's departure from Underoath. In 2005, Maylene and the Sons of Disaster signed to Mono Vs Stereo and released their self-titled debut album.

The band name and concept are based on the legend of the criminal gang of Ma Barker and her sons, noting that evil lifestyles will be met with divine justice.

History

Earlier years and II (2004-2009)

In April 2006, it was announced that the band had signed to Ferret Music. In August of that year, the group hinted they would be working on their Ferret Records debut in October with an expected release date of early 2007. Vocalist Dallas Taylor (formerly of Underoath) updated fans once again in January 2007 and said they would be releasing an EP called The Day Hell Broke Loose at Sicard Hollow, followed by their full-length album, II.

Maylene and the Sons of Disaster's II was released on Ferret Records on March 20, 2007, nationwide. Maylene appeared on the cover of the March/April 2007 issue of HM Magazine.

Throughout April 2007, the band went on tour in support of their new album II with Christian metalcore band Haste the Day. Other bands on tour included From Autumn to Ashes, The Sleeping, and Alesana.

In May, the band was featured on the "Dirty South Tour" with Underoath, Norma Jean, and The Glass Ocean. Notably, this is the first time vocalist Dallas Taylor toured with his old band since he left in 2003. Other bands touring with them with similar southern music styles are He Is Legend and Hey You Party Animals.

In an interview, Dallas Taylor said: "What has always struck me about the Ma Barker story is how much it symbolizes the idea of 'what goes around, comes around.' Divine justice is unavoidable. When I was a kid, I would see re-enactments of the Barker shooting in Ocala every year with my Grandpa, and it was as if Ma Barker and her sons were still screaming their story to anyone who would listen. Maylene and the Sons of Disaster is made up of five dudes who play the role of the Barker sons, and in these songs we speak as though we were them, telling any who would listen that a life lived unjustly will meet divine justice on the other side. We also wanted to think of the most crazy backwoods theme possible for this band. Since Ma was backwoods, and we are backwoods, this is the way it had to be." When asked if they play Christian music, Taylor admits that "For us our faith is what makes us. We believe in showing our fans respect and kindness. I love it when bands minister, as long as their lifestyle off the stage lives up to their life on stage. Nowadays it is kinda cliche in some markets to be a Christian band but being that in itself is hard and sometimes can put a bull's eye on your back. It is not an easy thing sometimes, but no one is perfect. But living to the standards of what you preach and talk about is a big deal and something we chose to do everyday." Taylor has also been quoted as saying that he is tired of bands that try to play off their Christian background or message to sell records or to perpetuate their popularity and stated: "I want every kid to know I am not going to change who I really am to sell records. I mean, I absolutely hate shoving things down people's throats, but hiding who you are is just as bad."

III (2009-2011)

From September to November 2008, they headlined a full U.S. tour with support from A Static Lullaby, Showbread, Confide, and Attack Attack! before beginning to record their third album, III. Half of the members recording this album were in Underoath during their early days.

Their third album, entitled III was released on June 23, 2009.  The song "Just a Shock" was released to the band's Myspace page on May 11, 2009. III debuted at No. 71 on the Billboard 200.

From September 2009 to February 2010, Dallas took some time off from touring to deal with some things in his personal life. With the band not wanting to miss any tour dates, they recruited their good friend Schuylar Croom, vocalist for He Is Legend, to fill in for Dallas. During these tours, no original members of the band were present onstage, as Roman had recently left the band and Dallas is the only original member remaining in the band's lineup.

On July 16, the band embarked on the Thee Summer Bailout Tour with Emery, Closure in Moscow, and Kiros on all dates, and Ivoryline and Secret & Whisper on select dates.

They performed the entrance theme for the former Unified WWE Tag Team Champions Chris Jericho and The Big Show, entitled "Crank the Walls Down". Their song "Step Up (I'm On It)" was also the theme for WWE Bragging Rights.

The band was also featured on the Taste of Chaos Tour in Europe at the end of 2009.

On Monday, December 7, 2009, while en route to a show in Wiesbaden, Germany for the Taste of Chaos tour, Maylene was involved in an accident resulting in mild damage to the band's tour bus. According to guitarist Kelly Nunn's personal Facebook page, the bus collided with a car, a gas tanker and a guard rail. The band was not injured, but missed their performance time. The band did, however, appear at the merchandise booths later in the day. During the spring of 2010 they were a supporting act with Saosin, and later Story of the Year. That summer, they headlined Scream the Prayer, along with For Today.

IV (2011-2014)
Maylene released their fourth album on September 27, 2011. The band's first single "In Dead We Dream" was released online before the album release date. 
Maylene's official Twitter said on March 2 "There is no way to describe this record. Be ready to have your minds open to the best Maylene yet."  The album is again on Ferret Records and was produced by Brian Virtue and Rob Graves. Dallas was quoted saying "We are so excited about this new record… it will be by far our best yet. We couldn't ask for a better group of people on board making this record happen."

Taylor's ATV accident and recovery(2015-present)
Dallas has been cited on a podcast and on tour that they will begin recording a new album in January 2015. Whether it is to be an independent release or on a label is to be determined. On November 29, Taylor posted a photo showing that the band was already recording for the new album.

On December 12, 2015, vocalist Dallas Taylor and guitarist Jake Duncan were attacked by police officers outside of a bar. The officers slammed Duncan's head on the pavement multiple times, while Taylor's knee was opened. Taylor was held in an detainment cell for an hour, but Duncan was arrested on disorderly conduct charges. On August 3, 2016, Underoath released a statement saying that Taylor had been hospitalized due to an ATV accident. Rhett Taylor, Dallas's brother, said that Dallas suffered multiple broken bones, internal bleeding, and head injuries. On September 17, 2016, the band played a benefit show for Taylor's medical bills. The band had Keller Harbin (The Chariot/ETID) and Matthew Hasting (MyChildren MyBride) fill in for Taylor. The show was put together by Dallas's long time friend (Michael Frog Ray) and bandmate in a side band with Taylor called Zeal. Maylene and the Sons of Disaster went on hiatus from 2016 to 2022 to allow Taylor time to recover.

Early in January 2022, a video leaked of Scott Hansen directing a new music video for the band, which was officially announced as the band's "comeback" video on January 7. Former Underoath member, Octavio Fernandez, was also present at the filming of the music video.

In March 2022, Furnace Fest announced that Maylene and the Sons of Disaster would be playing their first show in six years that September, featuring a recovered Taylor. The band later announced a show the day before Furnace Fest in Tampa, FL, and sold out presale tickets. The band's "comeback" single, "Burn the Witches", was released alongside a music video on September 6, 2022.

Members

Current members
Dallas Taylor  (formerly of Underoath) – lead vocals (2004–present), acoustic guitar, banjo (2009–present)
Brad Lehmann – bass, backing vocals (2009–present)
Jasin Todd (ex-Shinedown/Fuel) – lead guitar (2014–present), rhythm guitar (2014–2015)
Steve Savis – rhythm guitar, backing vocals (2015–present) 
Jon Thatcher Longley – drums (2015–present; touring 2011)

Touring musicians
Sam Anderson – drums, backing vocals (2011, 2014)
Josh Butler (Between the Trees) – drums (2011) 
Schuylar Croom (He Is Legend) – lead vocals (2009–2010)
Matthew Hastings (MyChildren MyBride) – lead vocals (2016)
Keller Harbin (formerly of The Chariot, Every Time I Die) – lead vocals (2016)
Luis Mariani – rhythm guitar, backing vocals (2011)

Former members
Josh Cornutt – lead guitar (2004–2008)
Scott Collum – rhythm guitar (2004–2008), lead guitar (2005–2008)
Lee Turner – drums (2004–2008) 
Roman Haviland – bass, backing vocals (2004–2009)
Josh Williams – rhythm guitar (2005–2008)
Kelly Scott Nunn (formerly of SBTR, formerly of Underoath) – rhythm guitar, backing vocals (2008–2010), lead guitar (2009–2010)
Matt Clark (formerly of SBTR, formerly of Underoath) – drums, backing vocals (2008–2011) 
Chad Huff - lead guitar (2008-2015), rhythm guitar (2011–2013)
Jake Duncan – rhythm guitar, backing vocals (2009–2011, 2013–2022), lead guitar (2015–2022) 
Miles McPherson – drums (2011–2014)

Timeline

Discography

Studio albums

EPs

Singles

Videography 
"Tough As John Jacobs" - Maylene and the Sons of Disaster (2005, Mono Vs Stereo)
"Dry the River" - II (2007, Ferret Records)
"Darkest of Kin" - II (2007, Ferret Records)
"The Day Hell Broke Loose at Sicard Hollow" - II (2007, Ferret Records)
"Raised by the Tide" - II (2009, Ferret Records)
"Step Up (I'm on It)" - III (2009, Ferret Records)
"Listen Close" - III (2011, Ferret Records)
"Open Your Eyes" - IV (2012, Ferret Records)

References

External links
 
 YouTube

American post-hardcore musical groups
American Christian metal musical groups
Metalcore musical groups from Alabama
Christian hardcore musical groups
Musical groups established in 2004
American southern rock musical groups
Musical quintets
Musical groups from Birmingham, Alabama
Ferret Music artists